The African wattled lapwing (Vanellus senegallus) is sometimes called Senegal wattled plover.

The Senegal lapwing or lesser black-winged lapwing (Vanellus lugubris) is a species of bird in the family Charadriidae.
It is found in Angola, Burundi, Cameroon, Republic of the Congo, Democratic Republic of the Congo, Ivory Coast, Eswatini, Gabon, Gambia, Ghana, Guinea, Kenya, Liberia, Malawi, Mali, Mozambique, Nigeria, Rwanda, Senegal, Sierra Leone, Somalia, South Africa, Tanzania, Togo, Uganda, Zambia, and Zimbabwe.

References

External links
 Senegal lapwing - Species text in The Atlas of Southern African Birds.

Senegal lapwing
Birds of Sub-Saharan Africa
Senegal lapwing
Taxonomy articles created by Polbot
Taxa named by René Lesson